Larsenianthus wardianus is a monocotyledonous plant species described by W. J. Kress, Thet Htun, and Bordelon. Larsenianthus wardianus is part of the genus Larsenianthus and the family Zingiberaceae.  No subspecies are listed in the Catalog of Life.

References 

Zingiberoideae